
Fayyad (Arabic: فَيَّاض fayyāḍ), also spelt Fayyadh, is an Arabic masculine given name which means "elaborate, flowing, plentiful, abundant". The Persian spelling is Fayyaz.

It may refer to:

Places
 Fayyad, Ras al-Khaimah, a settlement in the United Arab Emirates

People

Given name
 Fayyad Abdel Moneim (born 1957), Egyptian academic and economist
 Fayyad Sbaihat, a Palestinian American writer

Surname
 Feras Fayyad, Syrian documentary filmmaker, director of Last Men in Aleppo and The Cave
 Mohammad Ishaq Al-Fayyad, a Grand Ayatollah of Iraq
 Salam Fayyad, a Palestinian politician
 Usama Fayyad, Yahoo!'s chief data officer and executive vice president of Research & Strategic Data Solutions

See also
Fayad, a given name and surname